The 1980 Major League Baseball All-Star Game was the 51st midseason exhibition between the all-stars of the American League (AL) and the National League (NL), the two leagues comprising Major League Baseball. The game was played on July 8, 1980, at Dodger Stadium in Los Angeles, California, home of the Los Angeles Dodgers of the National League. The game resulted in a 4–2 victory for the NL.

While this would mark the second time that the Dodgers had hosted the All-Star Game in Los Angeles, it was the first time that the game was being held at Dodger Stadium.  Their first time as host in 1959 saw the game played at Los Angeles Memorial Coliseum; the Dodgers' Los Angeles home field until the construction of Dodger Stadium.

This All-Star Game would be known for some exemplary pitching performances, most notably AL starter Steve Stone's (three perfect innings, three strikeouts).  Jerry Reuss struck out the side for the NL in the sixth, as well.

It would also be one of the final games for NL starter J. R. Richard.  Richard was diagnosed with a career-ending stroke weeks later.

The pregame ceremonies of the All-Star Game featured Disney characters.  Later, Edwards Air Force Base of Rosamond, California, provided both the colors presentation and, after the Los Angeles All-City Band performed the Canadian and U.S. National Anthems, the flyover ceremonies.  This All-Star Game marked the first nationally televised US performance of O Canada after it had officially been designated the Canadian National Anthem seven days earlier on July 1, 1980. It also marked the debut of the modern-day large-scale video screen, with the first such video scoreboard, Diamond Vision by Mitsubishi Electric, being introduced at this game.

Game summary
The AL and NL were locked in a scoreless duel for four innings, including Stone's performance mentioned above.  Fred Lynn would break the deadlock in the top of the fifth with a two-run homer off Bob Welch.

The National League came back with a single run in their half of the fifth when Ken Griffey homered off Tommy John.  The NL took the lead in the bottom of the sixth when George Hendrick singled home Ray Knight and Phil Garner scored on a Willie Randolph error.

The NL's final run scored in the seventh when Dave Concepcion reached on a fielder's choice, went to second on a wild-pitch by Dave Stieb, then to third on a passed ball by Darrell Porter, and came home on another Stieb wild pitch.

Rosters
Players in italics have since been inducted into the National Baseball Hall of Fame.

American League

National League

Game

Umpires

Starting lineups

Game summary

References

External links
Baseball Almanac
Baseball-Reference.com

All-Star Game
Major League Baseball All-Star Game
Baseball competitions in Los Angeles
Major League Baseball All Star Game
July 1980 sports events in the United States
1980 in Los Angeles